The 2009 Manitoba Scotties Tournament of Hearts (Manitoba's provincial women's curling championship) was held February 4-8 at the Yellowhead Centre in Neepawa. The winning Barb Spencer team represented Manitoba at the 2009 Scotties Tournament of Hearts in Victoria, British Columbia. The reigning provincial champion, Jennifer Jones, won the 2008 Scotties Tournament of Hearts and thereby had already qualified for the 2009 event as Team Canada.

Teams

Black Group

Red Group

* Scalena skips and throws lead stones

Standings

Black Group

Red Group

Results

Draw 1
February 4, 0830

Draw 2
February 4, 1215

Draw 3
February 4, 1600

Draw 4
February 4, 2000

Draw 5
February 5, 0830

Draw 6
February 5, 1215

Draw 7
February 5, 1600

Draw 8
February 5, 1945

Draw 9
February 6, 0830

Draw 10
February 6, 1215

Draw 11
February 6, 1600

Draw 12
February 6, 1945

Draw 13
February 7, 0830

Draw 14
February 7, 1215

Playoffs

R1 vs. B1
February 7, 1900

R2 vs. B2
February 7, 1900

Semifinal
February 8, 0930

Final
February 8, 1400

External links
Official site
Manitoba Curling Association

Manitoba
2009 in Manitoba
Curling in Manitoba
February 2009 sports events in Canada